Jenny Ulving, (born September 26, 1979 in Östersund), is a Swedish film and television actress. She started her career with the role of Bella in the soap opera Vänner och fiender (Friends and Foes) which was broadcast on Kanal 5.

Films
Glömskans brev (2004)
Strandvaskaren (2004)
Den Osynlige (2002)
Dubbel-åttan (2000)

TV series
Vänner och fiender (1996–1999)

References

External links
Strandvaskaren - More info (in Swedish language)

Swedish film actresses
Swedish television actresses
1979 births
Living people